Glucose/fructose/phosphoric acid (trade name Emetrol) is an over-the-counter antiemetic taken to relieve nausea and vomiting. Made by WellSpring Pharmaceutical Corporation, it was formerly distributed by McNeil Consumer Healthcare.

History
Emetrol was created by Kinney and Company of Columbus, Indiana and was first used in 1949.

It is a phosphorated carbohydrate solution, and comes in syrup form.

Contraindications
Since Emetrol contains fructose it is contraindicated for people with hereditary fructose intolerance (HFI). In diabetes patients, it can cause potentially harmful hyperglycaemia (high blood sugar).

References

External links 
Official site

Antiemetics
Products introduced in 1949
Combination drugs